The Holme Avenue Bridge is a closed-spandrel concrete arch bridge that carries Holme Avenue across Wooden Bridge Run (a tributary of Pennypack Creek) in Philadelphia, Pennsylvania. Owned by the Commonwealth of Pennsylvania's Department of Transportation, it should not to be confused with the other "Holme Avenue Bridge" over Pennypack Creek about 1,000 yards west of Wooden Bridge Run.

According to the Pennsylvania Historical and Museum Commission, this bridge "is a good example of an urban concrete bridge embellished to imitate stone."

History and architectural features
Built in 1921 by C. P. Boner, contractor, this bridge remains in use today.

Its concrete superstructure includes parapet railings with pebbled, recessed panels. Its concrete substructure includes smooth abutments, etched and pebbled wings, smooth intrados/ribs, and etched voussoirs.

It was listed on the National Register of Historic Places in 1988.

References

External links
Holme Avenue Bridge at BridgeHunter.com
Holme Avenue Bridge at Philadelphia Architects and Buildings

Arch bridges in the United States
Bridges on the National Register of Historic Places in Philadelphia
Concrete bridges in Pennsylvania
Northeast Philadelphia
Road bridges on the National Register of Historic Places in Pennsylvania